Angelo Frosi, born 31 January 1924 in San Bassano, was an Italian clergyman and auxiliary bishop for the 2nd Bishop of Diocese of Abaetetuba. He was ordained in 1948 and appointed a bishop in 1981. He died in 1995.

References

20th-century Italian Roman Catholic bishops
1924 births
1995 deaths
Roman Catholic bishops of Abaetetuba